The Peasant Group of Popular Councils was a left-wing political party in the Republic of Central Lithuania. It was formed in 1922, by breaking off from the Popular Councils during the govermend cadency, and held 7 seats in the Sejm of Central Lithuania. It supported the agrarianism and agrarian socialism. Its leader was Adam Uziembło.

Citations

Notes

References 

Political parties in the Republic of Central Lithuania
Political parties established in 1922
Political parties disestablished in 1922
Left-wing parties
Defunct agrarian political parties
Defunct socialist parties in Europe